Daniel Sadushi (born 28 April 1998) is an Albanian football player who most recently played as a defender for Oriku in the Albanian First Division.

References

External links
 Profile - FSHF

1998 births
Living people
Footballers from Vlorë
Albanian footballers
Association football defenders
Albania youth international footballers
Flamurtari Vlorë players
KF Butrinti players
KF Oriku players
Kategoria Superiore players
Kategoria e Parë players